Meri Dulari (English: My favorite) is a 2013 Pakistani drama serial directed by Amin Iqbal. Serial will broadcast on Geo TV from 13 March 2013. It is written by Nabeela Abar Raja and production by A & B Entertainment. It stars Sami Khan, Yumna Zaidi, Sana Askari and Nazli Nasr.

Plot
Abdaar (Yumna Zaidi) is slightly rebellious and initially behaves like a child. She lives with her grandfather and her mother. Both mother and daughter are condemned by other family members, who are always finding ways to put blame on them. Other family is of Bibijan (Saba Hameed) and her two sons, one is Galib (Taifoor Khan) and the other one is Yawar (Sami Khan). Initially, mischief makers try to defame Abdaar and succeed as her engagement breaks. Will the truth reveal itself later on? What will be the consequences and everyone's’ reaction?

Cast 
 Yumna Zaidi as Abdar
 Sami Khan as Yawar
 Saba Hameed
 Sana Askari
 Manzoor Qureshi
 Nazli Nasr
 Taifoor Khan
 Sana Javed

References

External links 
 

Geo TV original programming
2013 Pakistani television series debuts
Pakistani drama television series
Urdu-language television shows
A&B Entertainment